"Pseudomonas oryzae" is a species of pseudomonad bacteria.

References

Pseudomonadales
Bacteria described in 2013